"From Four Until Late" (or "From Four Till Late") is a blues song written by Delta blues musician Robert Johnson.  He recorded it in Dallas, Texas, during his second to last session for producer Don Law on June 19, 1937. The lyrics contained his philosophical lines of "a man is like a prisoner, and he's never satisfied".

British rock group Cream recorded the song for their debut album Fresh Cream in 1966.  Guitarist Eric Clapton provided the lead vocal. Clapton also recorded another version of the song on his Sessions for Robert J album in 2004.

References

Robert Johnson songs
Songs written by Robert Johnson
1937 songs
Cream (band) songs
Blues songs
Song recordings produced by Don Law